Albisheim is a municipality in the Donnersbergkreis, Rhineland-Palatinate, Germany. It is in the middle of the Zellertal.

History 

In the year 835 the village is first mentioned in a document. It has been a market town for many years. Also there was a palace, but it hasn't yet been found.

Traffic 
Near Albisheim there is the trunk B 47, and the village also has a railway station.

Sights 

 the Protestant church from 1792, 
 the historic town hall, a classicist building from 1832 and
 the 26-feet-high (8 metres) Warteturm at the wine hill. It was first mentioned 1551.

References

Municipalities in Rhineland-Palatinate
Donnersbergkreis